Ivan Aleksandrov Davidov (5 October 1943 – 19 February 2015) was a Bulgarian football midfielder who played for Bulgaria in the 1966 and 1970 FIFA World Cups. He also played for PFC Slavia Sofia.

Career
Davidov started his career at the age of 16 with Spartak Sofia, before he moved to Slavia Sofia in 1962. He spent 10 seasons of his career at Slavia, before retiring at the age of 29 in 1971. He died in 2015.

References

External links
FIFA profile

1943 births
2015 deaths
Footballers from Sofia
Bulgarian footballers
Bulgaria international footballers
Association football midfielders
First Professional Football League (Bulgaria) players
PFC Slavia Sofia players
1966 FIFA World Cup players
1970 FIFA World Cup players